Classic Tracks may refer to:

 Classic Tracks (The Cars album)
 Classic Tracks (Rick Wakeman album), 1993